is a combat flight simulation shooter game developed and published by Sega for the Mega Drive/Genesis console. It was one of the two launch titles for the console in Japan (the other one being Space Harrier II), as well as being one of the six launch titles for the console for its U.S. launch. It is a follow-up to the 1987 arcade game Thunder Blade.

It was later released for the Virtual Console on September 17, 2007. It was also included in the Sega Genesis Collection for PlayStation 2 and PlayStation Portable in 2007 and in Sonic's Ultimate Genesis Collection for Xbox 360 and PlayStation 3.

Gameplay
As in its predecessor, the player takes control of a helicopter which is used to attack a group of guerrillas. The helicopter itself uses guns and missiles, and can also air brake. A distinctive feature that also appears in the arcade game is the use of different viewpoints during the entire game; during normal gameplay and when fighting sub-bosses, the game utilizes a third-person perspective from behind the helicopter, similar to Space Harrier, but the camera changes to a top-down perspective when fighting bosses. Super Thunder Blade had four stages of play.

Reception
The game received positive reviews upon release. ACE magazine rated it 880 out of 1000 and listed it as one of the top five best games available for the Mega Drive in 1989. Computer and Video Games rated it 80% and called it the "best version" of Thunder Blade on "any" system.

The game later received mixed retrospective reviews in the 2000s. In 2007, IGN gave the game a 4 out of 10, citing a framerate that was "far too jumpy" and lamenting that the game "just couldn't make the jump to console" from its arcade cabinet counterpart.

Other versions 
Super Thunder Blade is the title of the Mega Drive release. This was done to differentiate it from the Master System release, known as Thunder Blade, which was a port from the arcade version. There were few differences between the arcade and Mega Drive versions, save for some minor level development changes and the gameplay; the initial top-down sections (occurring before the third-person sections) were omitted from the Mega Drive version.

References

External links
Official Virtual Console website 
MobyGames entry on the game

1988 video games
Helicopter video games
Scrolling shooters
Sega video games
Sega Genesis games
Video game sequels
Virtual Console games
Video games developed in Japan